The 2008 UAE 1st GP2 Asia Series round was a GP2 Asia Series motor race held on 25 and 26 January 2008 at Dubai Autodrome in Dubai, United Arab Emirates. It was the first round of the 2008 GP2 Asia Series.

Classification

Qualifying

Feature race 

 Sébastien Buemi finished 7th, but he was rejected because his car not conforming.

Sprint race

Standings after the event 

Drivers' Championship standings

Teams' Championship standings

 Note: Only the top five positions are included for both sets of standings.

See also 
 2008 UAE 1st Speedcar Series round

References

GP2 Asia Series
GP2 Asia